Maretha Dea Giovani (born 27 March 1994) is an Indonesian doubles specialist badminton player affiliated with Mutiara Cardinal Bandung club.

Achievements

Southeast Asian Games 
Women's doubles

BWF Grand Prix 
The BWF Grand Prix had two levels, the Grand Prix and Grand Prix Gold. It was a series of badminton tournaments sanctioned by the Badminton World Federation (BWF) and played between 2007 and 2017.

Women's doubles

  BWF Grand Prix Gold tournament
  BWF Grand Prix tournament

BWF International Challenge/Series 
Women's doubles

  BWF International Challenge tournament
  BWF International Series tournament

Performance timeline

Indonesian team 
 Senior level

Individual competitions 
 Senior level

References 

1994 births
Living people
People from Sleman Regency
Sportspeople from Special Region of Yogyakarta
Indonesian female badminton players
Competitors at the 2015 Southeast Asian Games
Southeast Asian Games bronze medalists for Indonesia
Southeast Asian Games medalists in badminton
21st-century Indonesian women